WIC Radio Ltd v Simpson (2008) is a case on appeal from the Court of Appeal for British Columbia to the Supreme Court of Canada on defamation.

After CKNW radio talk show host Rafe Mair broadcast an editorial that compared activist Kari Simpson to Adolf Hitler, the Ku Klux Klan, and former Alabama governor George Wallace, among others, Simpson sued Mair and his employer, WIC Radio Ltd., for defamation.

A 2006 B.C. Court of Appeal decision written by then-justice Mary Southin, concluded that Mair defamed Simpson and couldn't rely on the defence of fair comment. In 2008, the Supreme Court of Canada ruled that Mair had, in fact, defamed Simpson.  However, the Supreme Court used this case to re-define defamation in Canada.  Because the old legal test no longer applied, the Supreme Court found for the appellants Mair and WIC Radio Ltd.

The Supreme Court decision was regarded as likely to encourage public commentators to be more brave in criticizing public figures.

References

External links 
Decision of Supreme Court of Canada 

Section Two Charter case law
Supreme Court of Canada cases
2008 in Canadian case law
Canadian freedom of expression case law